Wead is an American surname. It may refer to:

Ethel T. Wead Mick (1881–1957), American founder of Job's Daughters International
Frank Wead (1895–1947), American aviator and screenwriter
Doug Wead (born 1946), American historian and philanthropist
Mike Wead or Mikael Wikström (born 1967), Swedish guitarist